Roland Prince was an Antiguan jazz guitarist. He was born in St. John's on August 27th, 1946. He died on July 15, 2016, aged 69.

Discography

As leader
1976: Color Vision (with Virgil Jones, Frank Foster, Kenny Barron, Al Foster, Eddie Moore, Bob Cranshaw)
1977: Free Spirit

As sideman
With Johnny Hartman
 Today (Perception, 1972)
With Roy Haynes
Senyah (Mainstream, 1972)
With Pat LaBarbera
The Wizard (Dire, 1978)
With Billy Mitchell
Now's the Time (Catalyst, 1976)
With David Murray
Black & Black (Red Baron, 1991)
With Compost
Life is Round (1973)
With Elvin Jones
New Agenda (Vanguard, 1975)
Mr. Thunder (EastWest, 1975)
Summit Meeting (Vanguard, 1976) with James Moody, Clark Terry and Bunky Green 
Remembrance (MPS, 1978)
Elvin Jones Music Machine (Mark Levinson, 1978)
Live in Japan 1978: Dear John C. (Trio (Japan), 1978)
Elvin Jones Jazz Machine Live in Japan Vol. 2 (Trio (Japan), 1978)
With Shirley Scott
Lean on Me (Cadet, 1972)
with Buddy Terry
Awareness (Mainstream, 1971)
With Larry Willis
Inner Crisis (Groove Merchant, 1973)

References

1946 births
Jazz guitarists
2016 deaths
Compost (band) members